The Maine Colony Historic District is a U.S. historic district (designated as such on October 5, 2005) located in Sarasota, Florida. The district is bounded by Swift Road, Ashton Road, Portland Way and Grafton Street.

References

External links
 Sarasota County listings at National Register of Historic Places

National Register of Historic Places in Sarasota County, Florida
Historic districts on the National Register of Historic Places in Florida
Buildings and structures in Sarasota, Florida